The  (abbreviation: MWS) is a private school for girls in Bad Homburg vor der Höhe, Hesse, Germany.

The eponym is Mary Ward (1585–1645). The school has approximate 28 teachers and 400 students.

References

External links 
 Official website of the  

High schools in Germany
Private schools in Germany
Girls' schools in Germany
Educational institutions established in 1896
Bad Homburg vor der Höhe
Schools in Hesse
1896 establishments in Germany